John Holt may refer to:

Politics
 John Holt (publisher) (1721–1784), publisher and mayor of Williamsburg, Virginia
 John Langford-Holt (1916–1993), British Member of Parliament
 John Holt (Australian politician) (1929–2012), New South Wales politician

Sports
 John Holt (American football) (1959–2013), American football cornerback
 John Holt (Australian footballer) (born 1962), for North Melbourne
 John Holt (basketball), American basketball player
 John Holt (cricketer) (1923–1997), West Indian cricketer
 John Holt (footballer, born 1956), Scottish footballer for Dundee United
 John Holt (swimmer) (1922–1966), British swimmer
 Johnny Holt (1865–1937), English footballer for Everton

Other
 John Holt (15th-century judge) (died 1418), English judge
 John Holt (English educator) (died 1504), educator of Henry VIII
 John Holt (academic) (died 1631), Oxford college head
 John Holt (Lord Chief Justice) (1642–1710), Lord Chief Justice of England and Wales
 John Holt (composer) (1726–1753), London bell ringer
 John Holt (Archdeacon of Salop) (died 1734), Anglican priest
 John Holt (author) (1743–1801), English author
 John Holt (businessman) (1841–1915), English shipping merchant
 John F. Holt (1915–1996), American medical doctor
 John Riley Holt (1918–2009), English experimental physicist
 John Holt (educator) (1923–1985), American homeschooling pioneer
 John Holt (singer) (1947–2014), Jamaican reggae singer
 John Holt (veterinarian) (1931–2013), Australian veterinarian and Olympic shooter
 John Holt & Co (Liverpool), a United Kingdom company
 John Holt plc, Nigerian conglomerate

See also
 John Dominis Holt (disambiguation), multiple people
 Jack Holt (disambiguation)